Arciso Artesiani (21 January 1922 – 16 March 2005) was an Italian professional Grand Prix motorcycle road racer.

Born in Marzabotto, Emilia-Romagna, Artesiani competed from 1949 to 1951 riding a 500cc motorcycle for MV Agusta. In 1949, Artesiani finished the 500cc season in third place behind Leslie Graham and Nello Pagani.

Placement  in  Motorcycle World Championship

References 

1922 births
Sportspeople from the Metropolitan City of Bologna
Italian motorcycle racers
500cc World Championship riders
2005 deaths